Roberto Amaya (born 12 September 1944) is an Argentine boxer. He competed in the men's light welterweight event at the 1964 Summer Olympics.

References

External links

1944 births
Living people
Argentine male boxers
Olympic boxers of Argentina
Boxers at the 1964 Summer Olympics
Light-welterweight boxers